Cory Devela  (born August 5, 1984) is an American mixed martial artist who last competed in 2016.

Background
Devela began wrestling in elementary school and continued through middle and high school. After graduating, Devela attended Yakima Valley Community College on a wrestling scholarship. Devela fell into mixed martial arts while in college. He has been fighting professionally since 2004. Devela trains with veteran fighter Dennis "Superman" Hallman at Victory Athletics in Yelm, Wash.

Mixed martial arts career

Strikeforce
After defeating by unanimous decision "The Ultimate Fighter 1 " fighter and WEC veteran Lodune Sincaid Devela was signed by Strikeforce. And at the debut in middleweight slammed UFC veteran Joe Riggs. But in the next he was knocked out by Terry Martin. At June 19 of 2009 he loss to Luke Rockhold by rear naked choke. After this fight Devela dropped to welterweight and met with Bobby Voelker at Strikeforce Challengers: del Rosario vs. Mahe and lost by split decision.

Championships and accomplishments
High Roller Productions
HRP Middleweight Championship (One time)
Sparta Combat League
SCL Middleweight Championship (One time; current)

Mixed martial arts record

|-
|  Loss
| align=center| 16–7
| Louis Taylor
| Technical submission (guillotine choke)
| WSOF 29
| 
| align=center| 1
| align=center| 0:29
| Greeley, Colorado, United States
|
|-
|  Win
| align=center| 16–6
| Adam Stroup
| Decision (unanimous)
| SCL: Rumble on the Mountain
| 
| align=center| 3
| align=center| 5:00
| Loveland, Colorado, United States
| 
|-
|  Win
| align=center| 15–6
| Nick Ring
| Decision (unanimous)
| School of Hard Knocks 44
| 
| align=center| 3
| align=center| 5:00
| Calgary, Alberta, Canada
| 
|-
|  Win
| align=center| 14–6
| Jared Torgeson
| Submission (rear-naked choke)
| SCL 41: Army vs. Marines Washington
| 
| align=center| 3
| align=center| N/A
| Everett, Washington, United States
| 
|-
|  Win
| align=center| 13–6
| David Anderson
| Submission (short choke)
| Rumble on the Ridge 29
| 
| align=center| 1
| align=center| 2:12
| Snoqualmie, Washington, United States
| 
|-
|  Loss
| align=center| 12–6
| Brent Knopp
| TKO (punches)
| CageSport 28
| 
| align=center| 4
| align=center| 2:37
| Tacoma, Washington, United States
| 
|-
|  Win
| align=center| 12–5
| Byron Sutton
| TKO (punches)
| CageSport 27
| 
| align=center| 1
| align=center| 3:11
| Tacoma, Washington, United States
| 
|-
|  Loss
| align=center| 11–5
| Bobby Voelker
| Decision (split)
| Strikeforce Challengers: del Rosario vs. Mahe
| 
| align=center| 3
| align=center| 5:00
| Everett, Washington, United States
| Welterweight debut
|-
|  Loss
| align=center| 11–4
| Luke Rockhold
| Submission (rear-naked choke)
| Strikeforce Challengers: Villasenor vs. Cyborg
| 
| align=center| 1
| align=center| 0:30
| Kent, Washington, United States
| 
|-
|  Loss
| align=center| 11–3
| Terry Martin
| KO (punch)
| Strikeforce: At The Mansion II
| 
| align=center| 3
| align=center| 2:08
| Los Angeles, California, United States
| 
|-
|  Win
| align=center| 11–2
| Dan Molina
| Decision (unanimous)
| XCC 6: Western Threat
| 
| align=center| 3
| align=center| 5:00
| Reno, Nevada, United States
| 
|-
|  Win
| align=center| 10–2
| Joe Riggs
| TKO (slam)
| Strikeforce: At The Dome
| 
| align=center| 1
| align=center| 1:22
| Tacoma, Washington, United States
| Riggs injured ribs after a slam by Devela
|-
|  Win
| align=center| 9–2
| Lodune Sincaid
| Decision (unanimous)
| SF 21: Seasons Beatings
| 
| align=center| 3
| align=center| 5:00
| Portland, Oregon, United States
| 
|-
|  Win
| align=center| 8–2
| Tom Jones
| TKO (punches)
| HRP: Fight Night
| 
| align=center| 1
| align=center| 2:02
| Tulsa, Oklahoma, United States
| 
|-
|  Win
| align=center| 7–2
| John Krohn
| Submission (kimura)
| SF 20: Homecoming
| 
| align=center| 2
| align=center| N/A
| Portland, Oregon, United States
| 
|-
|  Win
| align=center| 6–2
| Dave Knight
| Submission (verbal)
| XFC: Dome of Destruction 5
| 
| align=center| 2
| align=center| 0:54
| Yakima, Washington, United States
| 
|-
|  Win
| align=center| 5–2
| Nick Tyree
| Submission (rear-naked choke)
| XFC: Dome of Destruction 4
| 
| align=center| 1
| align=center| N/A
| Tacoma, Washington, United States
| 
|-
|  Win
| align=center| 4–2
| Jeff Dietrich
| Decision (unanimous)
| USA MMA: Pacific Northwest Invitational 1
| 
| align=center| 5
| align=center| 5:00
| Tacoma, Washington, United States
| 
|-
|  Loss
| align=center| 3–2
| Ed Herman
| Submission (armbar)
| PFA: Pride and Fury
| 
| align=center| 1
| align=center| 3:20
| Worley, Idaho, United States
| 
|-
|  Win
| align=center| 3–1
| Adam Yohe
| TKO (submission to punches)
| USA MMA: Fight Time
| 
| align=center| 1
| align=center| 1:02
| Lakewood, Washington, United States
| 
|-
|  Win
| align=center| 2–1
| Matt Armstrong
| TKO (punches)
| FCFF: Rumble at the Roseland 12
| 
| align=center| 2
| align=center| 1:49
| Portland, Oregon, United States
| 
|-
|  Win
| align=center| 1–1
| Michael Perales
| Submission
| FCFA: Rumble in Sonoyta
| 
| align=center| 1
| align=center| 2:08
| Sonoyta, Mexico
| 
|-
|  Loss
| align=center| 0–1
| Matt Horwich
| Submission (rear-naked choke)
| PPKA: Ultimate Fight Night 2
| 
| align=center| 2
| align=center| 1:24
| Pasco, Washington, United States
|

References

External links
 

1984 births
American male mixed martial artists
Mixed martial artists from Washington (state)
Middleweight mixed martial artists
Living people
Welterweight mixed martial artists
Mixed martial artists utilizing collegiate wrestling
People from Bonney Lake, Washington